Mircea is a Romanian masculine given name, a form of the South Slavic name Mirče (Мирче) that derives from the Slavic word mir, meaning 'peace'. It may refer to:

People

Princes of Wallachia 
 Mircea I of Wallachia (1355–1418), also known as Mircea the Elder
 Mircea II of Wallachia (1428–1447), grandson of Mircea I
 Mircea III Dracul, Voivode (Prince) of Wallachia in 1510
 Mircea the Shepherd (died 1559), son of Radu cel Mare
 Alexander II Mircea, Voivode of Wallachia from 1568 to 1574 and 1574 to 1577
 Prince Mircea of Romania (1913–1916)

Others 
Mircea Albulescu, professional name of Iorgu Constantin Albulescu (1934–2016), Romanian actor, university professor, journalist, poet and writer
Mircea Badea (born 1974),  Romanian political satirist, television host, media critic, radio personality and occasional actor
Mircea Baniciu (born 1949), Romanian musician, singer and songwriter
Mircea Brînzea (born 1986), Romanian aerobic gymnast
Mircea Cărtărescu (born 1956), Romanian poet, novelist, literary critic and essayist
Mircea Ciumara (1943–2012), Romanian politician and former cabinet minister
Mircea Coșea (born 1942), Romanian politician, economist, diplomat, essayist, journalist and professor
Mircea Costache II (1940–2016), Romanian handball player and coach
Mircea Crișan (1924–2013), Romanian comedian and comedic actor
Mircea Damian (1899–1948), Romanian writer and journalist
Mircea Daneliuc (born 1943), Romanian film director, screenwriter and actor
Mircea David (1914–1993), Romanian football goalkeeper
Mircea Demetriade (1861–1914), Romanian poet, playwright and actor
Mircea Diaconu (born 1949), Romanian actor and politician
Mircea Dinescu (born 1950), Romanian poet, journalist and editor
Mircea Druc (born 1949), Moldovan and Romanian politician, Prime Minister of Moldova between 1990 and 1991
Mircea Drăgan (born 1932), Romanian film director
Mircea Dușa (born 1955), Romanian economist and politician
Mircea Eliade (1907–1986), Romanian historian of religion, fiction writer, philosopher and professor
Mircea Florian (1888–1960), Romanian philosopher and translator
Mircea Florian (musician) (born 1949), Romanian musician, multimedia artist and computer scientist
Mircea Frățică (born 1957), Romanian retired judoka
Mircea Fulger (born 1959), Romanian retired boxer
Mircea Geoană (born 1958), Romanian politician
Mircea Gesticone (1902–1961), Romanian novelist and poet
Mircea Grosaru (1952–2014), Romanian politician
Mircea Ionescu-Quintus (born 1917-2017), Romanian politician and Minister of Justice from 1991 to 1992
Mircea Irimescu (born 1959), Romanian retired footballer
Mircea Lucescu (born 1945), Romanian football manager and former player
Mircea Monroe (born 1982), American model and actress
Mircea Mustață (born 1971), Romanian mathematician
Mircea Nedelciu (1950–1999), Romanian short-story writer, novelist, essayist and literary critic
Mircea Oltean (born 1982), Romanian former football goalkeeper
Mircea Oprea (born 1980), Romanian former footballer
Mircea Păcurariu (born 1932),  Romanian theologian, historian and Romanian Orthodox priest
Mircea Pârligras (born 1980), Romanian chess Grandmaster
Mircea Puta (1950—2007), Romanian mathematician
Mircea Răceanu (born 1935), Romanian diplomat
Mircea Rednic (born 1962), Romanian football manager and former player
Mircea Romașcanu (born 1953), Romanian former cyclist
Mircea Rus (born 1978), Romanian former footballer
Mircea Sasu (1939–1983), Romanian footballer
Mircea Șimon (born 1954), Romanian retired heavyweight boxer
Mircea Snegur (born 1940), first President of Moldova (1990–1997), Chairman of the Presidium of the Supreme Soviet (1989–1990) and Chairman of the Supreme Soviet in 1990
Mircea Streinul (1910–1945), Austro-Hungarian-born Romanian prose writer and poet
Mircea Veroiu (1941–1997), Romanian film director and screenwriter
Mircea Voicu (born 1980), Romanian former footballer
Mircea Vulcănescu (1904–1952), Romanian philosopher, economist, ethics teacher and sociologist arrested in 1946 and convicted under the Communist regime.
Mircea Zamfir (born 1985), Romanian aerobic gymnast

See also

References

Sources

Romanian masculine given names
Slavic-language names